The 2023 Richmond Spiders baseball team will represent the University of Richmond during the 2023 NCAA Division I baseball season. The Spiders played their home games at Malcolm U. Pitt Field as a member of the Atlantic 10 Conference. They will be led by head coach Tracy Woodson, in his tenth season with the program.

Previous season

The 2022 Richmond Spiders baseball team notched a 30–26 (11–13) regular season record earning the seventh seed and in the 2022 Atlantic 10 Conference baseball tournament. During the tournament, Richmond went on a run to the championship game before losing to their crosstown rivals, VCU.

Preseason

Preseason Atlantic 10 awards and honors
Outfielders Johnny Hipsman and Alden Mathes were named to the All-Atlantic 10 Preseason team.

Coaches poll 
The Atlantic 10 baseball coaches' poll was released on February 7, 2023. Richmond was picked to finish third the Atlantic 10.

Personnel

Starters

Schedule and results

Statistics

Team batting

Team pitching

Rankings

Notes

References

External links 
 University of Richmond Baseball

Richmond Spiders
Richmond Spiders baseball seasons
Richmond Spiders baseball
2023 in Richmond, Virginia